Thomas "Tommy" Smales (19 December 1934 – 26 October 2017) was an English professional rugby league footballer who played in the 1950s, 1960s and 1970s, and coached in the 1960s and 1970s.

Background
Tommy Smales's birth was registered in Pontefract, West Riding of Yorkshire, England, he was the landlord of the Traveller's Rest public house, Pontefract Road, Featherstone for 35-years, from 1969 until 2004, and he died aged 82 in Leeds, West Yorkshire, England.

Playing career

International honours
Tommy Smales won a cap for England while at Huddersfield in 1962 against France, and won caps for Great Britain while at Huddersfield in 1962 against France, in 1963 against France, and Australia, in 1964 against France (2 matches), and while at Bradford Northern in 1965 against New Zealand (3 matches).

Championship final appearances
Tommy Smales played , and was captain in Huddersfield's 14-5 victory over Wakefield Trinity in the Championship Final during the 1961–62 season at Odsal Stadium, Bradford on Saturday 19 May 1962.

Challenge Cup Final appearances
Tommy Smales played , and was captain in Huddersfield's 6-12 defeat by Wakefield Trinity in the 1961–62 Challenge Cup Final during the 1961–62 season at Wembley Stadium, London on Saturday 12 May 1962, in front of a crowd of 81,263.

County Cup Final appearances
Tommy Smales played , and scored a try in Huddersfield's 15-8 victory over York in the 1957–58 Yorkshire County Cup Final during the 1957–58 season at Headingley Rugby Stadium, Leeds on Saturday 19 October 1957, played  in the 10-16 defeat by Wakefield Trinity in the 1960–61 Yorkshire County Cup Final during the 1960–61 season at Headingley Rugby Stadium, Leeds on Saturday 29 October 1960, and played  in Bradford Northern's 17-8 victory over Hunslet in the 1965–66 Yorkshire County Cup Final during the 1965–66 season at Headingley Rugby Stadium, Leeds on Saturday 16 October 1965.

Club career
Tommy Smales made his début for Featherstone Rovers on Saturday 25 September 1965, he appears to have scored no drop-goals (or field-goals as they are currently known in Australasia), but prior to the 1974–75 season all goals, whether; conversions, penalties, or drop-goals, scored 2-points, consequently prior to this date drop-goals were often not explicitly documented, therefore '0' drop-goals may indicate drop-goals not recorded, rather than no drop-goals scored.

Coaching career

Challenge Cup Final appearances
Tommy Smales was the coach in Castleford's 7-2 victory over Wigan in the 1969–70 Challenge Cup Final during the 1969–70 season at Wembley Stadium, London on Saturday 9 May 1970, in front of a crowd of 95,255.

Club career
Tommy Smales was the coach of Castleford, his first game in charge was on Sunday 3 August 1969, and his last game in charge was on Saturday 28 November 1970.

Genealogical information
Tommy Smales was the uncle of the rugby league footballer; Dale Fennell.

Note
Somewhat confusingly, Tommy Smales played in the same era as the unrelated Wigan, Barrow and Featherstone Rovers  of the 1950s and 1960s, Thomas "Tommy" Smales.

References

External links
Rogers receives late call-up
 Video 'Wakefield Win Cup 1962' at britishpathe.com
(archived by web.archive.org) The Millennium Masters - Backs
Photograph "Huddersfield v Wakefield Trinity 1962 - Huddersfield beat Wakefield in this final, much against form, by 14 points to 5 in front of 37,451 the attendance being kept down by poor weather and a feeling that Wakefield would be much too strong for Huddersfield. Not so! - 01/01/1962" at rlhp.co.uk
Photograph "Return to Odsal - Ex-players lead out the team on the return to Odsal after two seasons at Valley Parade - 09/03/2003" at rlhp.co.uk
Photograph "Trevor kisses the turf - Trevor Foster kisses the turf on the return to Odsal after two seasons at Valley Parade - 09/03/2003" at rlhp.co.uk

1934 births
2017 deaths
Bradford Bulls players
Castleford Tigers coaches
Castleford Tigers players
England national rugby league team players
English rugby league coaches
English rugby league players
Featherstone Rovers coaches
Featherstone Rovers players
Great Britain national rugby league team captains
Great Britain national rugby league team players
Huddersfield Giants captains
Huddersfield Giants players
North Sydney Bears players
Publicans
Rugby league halfbacks
Rugby league players from Castleford
Wakefield Trinity players